Eugenia acunai is a species of plant in the family Myrtaceae. It is endemic to Cuba.

References

Endemic flora of Cuba
acunai
Endangered plants
Taxonomy articles created by Polbot